MS A Galeotta, is a French RoPax operated by Corsica Linea. She was built at Cantiere Navale Visentini in Porto Viro, Italy. She was put in January 2023 on the Marseille–Corsica route. A Galeotta is the first RoPax in service between Marseille and Corsica to be powered by liquefied natural gas (LNG).

References

External links
 
 A Galeotta on Corsica Linea official website

Ferries of France
Ships built in Italy
Ships built by Cantiere Navale Visentini
2021 ships